Empresa Nacional de Electricidad (ENDE) is a Bolivian public company that supplies electricity based in Cochabamba, Bolivia. Is engaged in the generation, transmission and distribution of electricity in Bolivia, is supervised and regulated by the Autoridad de Fiscalización y Control Social de Electricidad.

History 
It was created on February 9, 1962, by means of Supreme Decree No. 5999 and constituted on December 21, 1964. On February 4, 1965, it acquired legal personality through Supreme Resolution No. 127462, and on July 16, 2008, was refounded by Supreme Decree No. 29644. Its headquarters are located in Cochabamba.

Services 
The company is mainly engaged in the construction of Electric Dams to generate electricity.

References

External links 

Bolivian companies established in 1962
Energy companies of Bolivia
Government-owned companies of Bolivia